BuddyPress is an open-source social networking software package owned by Automattic since 2008. It is a plugin that can be installed on WordPress to transform it into a social network platform. BuddyPress is designed to allow schools, companies, sports teams, or any other niche community to start their own social network or communication tool.

BuddyPress inherits and expands on the functional elements of the WordPress engine including themes, plugins, and widgets. As it is built on WordPress, it is written using the same primary languages, PHP and MySQL.

In 2010, BuddyPress was placed third in Packt's Most Promising Open Source Project Awards, losing to Pimcore and TomatoCMS.

References

Further reading
 
 
 
 
 
 Jones, Kyle (2011). "Buddypress and higher education." Library Technology Reports/Gale. 47.3.

Blog software
Social software
Free software programmed in PHP
WordPress
Internet services supporting OpenID
Content management systems
Website management
2009 software